Lo-Pan is an American hard rock band from Columbus, Ohio. The band has been praised for its "ability to write a driving, catchy rock song in a well-established aesthetic while still sounding original, vibrant and exciting," and for "performing heavy rock that's at once infectious and distinctly ambitious." Their most recent album, Subtle, was released in May 2019.

History
The band formed in 2005 with bassist Skot Thompson, drummer Jesse Bartz, and guitarist Brian Fristoe. Singer Jeff Martin joined the following year. The band shares its name with a villain in the comedy-martial arts film Big Trouble in Little China. Lo-Pan started with a stoner rock sound but have since added elements of traditional hard rock and heavy metal. They released a self-titled album in 2006, then signed with Small Stone Recordings, which released the album Sasquanaut in 2009. Small Stone released their third album, Salvador, in 2011. That album was praised by AllMusic for achieving "a fluid balance of guitar-driven muscle and songwriting immediacy," with a nod to "remarkable singer" Jeff Martin.

Lo-Pan's 2014 album Colossus received widespread praise from the hard rock and heavy metal communities. For example, MetalSucks called the album "heavy, hooky" and "a juggernaut that will bring joy to your bros." Reviewer Birdie Garcia described the album as "a unique high steppin’ tune in its unusual doom presence, something that has a groove but can also be blasted on the road while going a million miles to nowhere," while SputnikMusic praised the album for "bludgeoning the listener with a cavalcade of gargantuan riffs from the ground up." Brian Fristoe left the band shortly after the release of Colossus and was replaced by Brujas del Sol guitarist Adrian Zambrano. Lo-Pan released the five-song EP In Tensions in early 2017; The Obelisk named the EP as its best short release of the year. Shortly after the EP was recorded, Zambrano departed due to the rigors of the band's touring schedule, and was replaced by Sleepers Awake guitarist Chris Thompson (no relation to bassist Skot Thompson). 

The band's fifth full-length album, Subtle, was released in May 2019. The album earned positive reviews from Kerrang!, which praised its "intense, swirling tunes that float with both an otherworldly grace and a devastating menace," Decibel, which called the album "a gem," and Consequence of Sound, which noted "Jeff Martin’s soaring vocals over sludgy riffs, providing a nice dichotomy of melodic and heavy."

On April 15, 2022 it was announced that Lo-Pan's drummer Jesse Bartz was diagnosed with cancer of his tonsils.

Members
Current members
Skot Thompson – bass (2005–present)
Jesse Bartz – drums (2005–present)
Jeff Martin – vocals (2006–present)
Chris Thompson – guitar (2016–present)
Former members
Brian Fristoe – guitar (2005–2014)
Adrian Zambrano – guitar (2014–2016)

Discography

Albums
Lo-Pan (2006)
Sasquanaut (2009, re-released 2011)
Salvador (2011)
Colossus (2014)
In Tensions (EP, 2017)
Subtle (2019)

References 

Musical groups from Ohio
Musical groups established in 2005